Spinulum annotinum, synonym Lycopodium annotinum, known as interrupted club-moss, or stiff clubmoss, is a species of clubmoss native to forests of the colder parts of North America (Greenland, St. Pierre & Miquelon, all 10 provinces and all 3 territories of Canada, Alaska, and mountains of the contiguous United States), as well as Asia (China, Russia, Japan, Korea, Nepal, Assam), and most of Europe. The genus Spinulum is accepted in the Pteridophyte Phylogeny Group classification of 2016 (PPG I), but not in other classifications, which submerge the genus in Lycopodium.

Spinulum annotinum is a common and widespread club-moss spreading by means of horizontal stems running along the surface of the ground. It is usually unbranched or sparingly branched, each branch containing a cone at the top. Leaves have minute teeth on their edges.

References

External links
 Photo of herbarium specimen at Missouri Botanical Garden, collected on Mt. Adams in New Hampshire in 1889, neotype of Lycopodium annotinum
 ,  Spinulum annotinum (L.) A. Haines  bristly clubmoss, common interrupted-clubmoss] photos plus New England distribution map
 , Spinulum annotinum (L.) A. Haines photos plus Michigan distribution map
 Digital Atlas of the Virginia Flora, Spinulum annotinum (L.) A. Haines photos plus Virginia distribution map
 Boreal Forest, Lycopodium annotinum Stiff Clubmoss description, photos, ecological information
 West Highland (Scotland) Flora, Interrupted Clubmoss, Lycopodium annotinum photos from near Skye in Scotland

Lycopodiaceae
Plants described in 1753
Taxa named by Carl Linnaeus
Flora of North America
Flora of Asia
Flora of Europe